Tyreke Smith (born February 14, 2000) is an American football outside linebacker for the Seattle Seahawks of the National Football League (NFL). He played college football at Ohio State.

College career
Smith played for Ohio State from 2018 to 2021. In college, Smith was known as a strong, quick defensive lineman with great awareness and technique. Despite being considered an injury risk over his career, Smith led the Big Ten Conference in quarterback hits, with 21 in his last two playing seasons.

Professional career

Smith was selected by the Seattle Seahawks in the fifth round (158th overall) in the 2022 NFL Draft. He was placed on injured reserve on August 30, 2022.

References

External links
 Seattle Seahawks bio
 Ohio State Buckeyes bio

2000 births
Living people
Players of American football from Cleveland
Ohio State Buckeyes football players
Seattle Seahawks players
American football defensive ends